Milankovič is a lunar impact crater that is located in the high northern latitudes on the far side of the Moon. Overlapping the southeastern rim is the smaller but more sharply defined crater Ricco. Just to the south is Karpinskiy, and to the north is the prominent Plaskett.

This is a worn and eroded crater formation with a distorted outer rim. In the northwestern quadrant of the crater interior is what appears to be a double rim. The outer rim is circular in form along this edge but shallow. The inner rim forms a somewhat linear shelf that runs from the north to the west sides. The remainder of rim is rounded and uneven. Within the interior, the outer rampart of Ricco covers the southeastern part of the floor. The rest of floor is relatively level, with only some low hills near the midpoint.

Satellite craters 
By convention these features are identified on lunar maps by placing the letter on the side of the crater midpoint that is closest to Milankovič.

See also 
 1605 Milankovitch, minor planet
 Milankovič (Martian crater)

References 

 
 
 
 
 
 
 
 
 
 
 
 

Impact craters on the Moon